Rycice  is a village in the administrative district of Gmina Chorzele, within Przasnysz County, Masovian Voivodeship, in east-central Poland.

The village has a population of 340.

References

Rycice